Dawsahak may mean:
the Dawsahak people (Idaksahak)
the Dawsahak language (Tadaksahak)